The Battle of Aphrodisium was a battle fought circa 238 BC between the Kingdom of Pergamon of Attalus I against Seleucid forces led by Antiochus Hierax, allied with the Galatian Gauls. Attalus was victorious.

In 241 BC Attalus had won a great victory against the Galatians, who were migrating into Anatolia from Thrace. Several years after this defeat the Galatians wished to retaliate against Attalus and so allied themselves with Antiochus Hierax, who was Seleucid ruler of much of Asia Minor and also wished to expand his influence. The allies invaded Pergamon but were defeated at Aphrodisium by Attalus.

Attalus would continue his war with Antiochus, winning many more victories. After a victory at the Battle of the Harpasus, Attalus would take control of near all of Seleucid Asia Minor, which he would hold until 221 BC.

References

Battles involving the Gauls
Battles involving the Seleucid Empire
Battles involving Pergamon
238 BC
230s BC conflicts
Mysia
Civil wars of antiquity